Gerald Dallas Royston Marshall (16 November 1941 – 21 April 2005) was a British saloon car racing driver. He was commonly referred to by the nickname Big Gerry. According to a 2002 edition of Motor Sport Magazine poll, he was one of the best drivers of all time. According to the 28 August 2019 edition of Motorsport News, he is the United Kingdom's number one British motorsport hero. He was awarded the BARC Gold Medal in 2002, the first saloon car driver to be presented with the honour and was a life member of the prestigious BRDC. He took 625 overall and class wins and countless championship wins throughout his motor racing career.

He was also well known in motoring circles for his successful car dealership, Marshall Wingfield, originally located on the Finchley Road, London, before moving to Brook Street in Tring and through his adult life lived in Harrow, Chiswell Green, Bricket Wood, Hemel Hempstead, Northchurch, Aston Clinton and Pitstone.

His ashes are buried at St. Leonards Church in Southoe, where his grandparents are also buried, and this is where he was relocated to during the Second World War WWII and an area that he knew well.

Career 
His professional driving career spans five decades, in 2000 chalking up his 600th win in a race at Snetterton Motor Racing Circuit, Norfolk in an Aston Martin DB4. His first Sprint victory was in 1963 driving a Mini, with his first race win following in 1964 (again in a Mini) and his last (and 625th) on 11 September 2004.

He is probably best remembered for his flamboyant and crowd-pleasing style during the 1970s driving for Dealer Team Vauxhall in the racing Firenzas "Old Nail" and "Baby Bertha", and also the V8 Holden-Repco Ventora, "Big Bertha". He also won the 1971 Escort Mexico championship, beating future Formula 1 World Champion Jody Scheckter and finished 2nd in the 1974 Avon Tour of Britain driving for the same team as the equally respected rally driver Roger Clark.

Marshall's style has been described as "sideways, on-the-edge cornering that was to distinguish his driving in any car, large or small, front or rear drive." This outward appearance belied an extraordinary cool-headed ability and intelligence behind the wheel.

His first biography, published in 1978, is titled Only Here For The Beer and a tribute edition was re-issued shortly after his death and his new biography (published by Haynes and written by Jeremy Walton and Gregor Marshall) was released in April 2010.

He died of a heart related illness whilst testing the ex-Richard Petty's IROC Chevrolet Camaro at Silverstone. His son, Gregor, is also a race driver and he also has two daughters.

Some of Marshall's career highlights:

In 1963, Marshall started his first footsteps into motor journalism, something he was to enjoy for many years and he brought a smile to the face of many a reader with his "Marshall Art" and "From the Hot Seat" columns that he regularly used to write. You could often find club event reports in Autosport with glowing tributes to a Gerry Marshall and then notice at the end of the report that it was written by a certain GDRM, G.Marshall or G.Maynard (his first wife's maiden name).

Marshall's first official race was at Brands Hatch in March 1964 and in qualifying he was quickest in his class, but the weather (for once) and lady luck conspired against him and the race was snowed off. Therefore, Marshall's first proper race was at Snetterton on the Easter Monday of 1964. Beginning what would quickly become a habit, he won the 1000cc class and continued winning that season.  Although he rolled the car at Mallory Park in practice he was able to keep racing until money and impending engagement (to Carol) forced the sale of the Mini and absence from the tracks for a few months.

Driving Newtune's 1275s in the Snetterton 500 km with David Warnsborough the pair won the 1300 cc class in the European Saloon Car Championship race.

Whilst working in London for Robbie Gordon and James Boothby he was offered a drive in June 1965 in a TVR Grantura. Marshall handled this with his usual verve and impressed Martin Lilley of Barnet Motor Company enough for him to offer a drive in a Lotus Elan and Marshall also went to work for the Barnet Motor Company, becoming sales manager and a director of TVR.

This change for Marshall proved to be a good one and as the sales manager he got to buy and sell many sports, GT and competition cars. Towards the end of 1965 and at the beginning of 1966 Marshall had a string of wins at Brands Hatch and also drove the company's TVR Griffith. It was reported at the time "This was a converted road car and only had a mildly-tweaked V8 motor, but it still went like stink!". With this car Marshall enhanced his blossoming reputation and photographers rushed out of their usual hiding spots whenever he was on track and got dramatic pictures of Marshall driving the TVR in his now customary sideways fashion. "It was the only way to drive the car" said Marshall, "although the Elan had to be driven neatly".

Also in 1966 Marshall raced Roy Ensor's 1275 Mini-Cooper S and a near-standard TVR 1800S Mk 3 in marque events, with some success. In the Brands Hatch six-hour race the car was very well placed when a wheel fell off with only a few minutes to go. Marshall and co-driver, his great friend Tony Lanfranchi, had got the car extremely well-placed whilst it was wet at the beginning of the race and it was only towards the end of the race when the track started to dry that several more potent cars managed to pass them.

"The meeting Gerry Marshall will want to forget" was the headline Auto News gave for a Brands Hatch sprint in the July. On a wet track Marshall had aquaplaned off the circuit at Paddock Hill Bend and pretty much wrote off the Barnet Motor Company's Elan, which had only been raced a handful of times. A week later, with a couple of broken ribs strapped up, Marshall raced a TVR at Silverstone in the Six-Hour Relay Race and there he lost a wheel twice.

In 1966 Marshall won numerous club races and gained publicity for the Barnet Motor Company. With Martin Lilley now being in charge of TVR Engineering (him and his father had rescued TVR from bankruptcy) Marshall's racing plans for 1967 seemed to naturally revolve around TVR; the TVR Griffith was ideal, especially with the planned 400 bhp 5.3 litre Ford V8, there was the possibility of the 1-litre TVR Tina (named after Marshall's eldest daughter and one of the two prototypes is owned by the Marshall family) and also the TVR 1800S.  In addition Marshall had the use of a Lotus Elan and there was a plan to go into partnership with Ken Ayres in a hot Mini 850.

Marshall also wanted to prove his "sideways" critics wrong by racing a single-seater and in one of the Motor Racing Stables Lotus cars at Brands Hatch he had already lapped as fast as the senior instructors.

As reported in Sporting Motorist "Gerry Marshall really gets to grips with his motor cars and flings them about with such gay abandon that people expect him to fly off the road – he has been named the Jochen Rindt of club racing, also the Mr. Dunlop Benefit (by commentator Barry Simons) but he rarely does and more often than not wins".

The 1970s really were Marshall's most prolific decade of motor racing. Club motor racing in Britain then was on the BBC every week (on Grandstand). It has always been widely reported that Marshall was not shy and retiring and this made him ideal for interviews, quotes, guest speaking at club and charity events and columns (he wrote in Car and Car Conversions, Motor and Autosport). He even had several films made, including Barry Hinchcliff's There's Only One Gerry, and the publications of Only Here for the Beer and Competition Driving.

Not only was there the numerous race and championship wins for Marshall in the DTV Vauxhalls but there was also his own forays into racing cars of his own, sponsoring others (including F1 World Champion Denis Hulme, Tony Lanfranchi and offering Colin Chapman and Graham Hill a drive in Marshall's Lotus XI) and his business, Marshall Wingfield, in partnership with John Wingfield.

Marshall also won the final car meeting to be held at Crystal Palace in 1972. Run by AMOC, the final race was a Historic Sports Car race. Marshall won in a Lister Jaguar, WTM446.

Marshall raced Lotus Elans, the special Costin Amigo, Ford Escorts (winning the inaugural Mexico Championship from Jody Scheckter in 1971 and also finishing runner up to Roger Clark in the 1974 Avon Tour of Britain), Lola T70, Holden Torana at Bathurst, Hillman Avenger, Clan Crusader, Austin Marina, Birdcage Maserati, Mk2 Jaguar, Sunbeam Tiger Le Mans, Porsche 924, an Alfa Romeo, Chevrolet Camaro and BMWs.

Marshall competed in hundreds of events, ranging from the one-make Ford Escort Mexico Championship, competed in many rallies (including second to Roger Clark in a Ford Escort in the '74 Avon Tour of Britain).

When in 1977 DTV and Vauxhall decided to go rallying everyone thought Marshall would be okay and there were rumours flying around of offers and deals involving Ford and Leyland products. The truth for '78 was somewhat different and he managed to scrape a deal together to race Colin Vandervell's '77 spec Ford Capri for the national Tricentrol championship and a Triumph Dolomite Sprint for the two production car championships, the Derwent TV/Shellsport and the Britax championships, with both cars being sponsored by Triplex, who were Colin's sponsor but due to work commitments he wouldn't be competing in '78. Marshall asked if Triplex would be prepared to throw in a few extra bob for the Dolomite. The Dolomite was prepared by Roger Dowson and Alistair Barrie under the Downie racing banner and the Capri was prepared by John Westwood.
The Dolomite turned out to be the far more successful of the two cars with 21class wins and three second places from 25 starts, with Marshall winning both the Derwent TV/Shellsport and the Britax championships in the Dolomite. The Capri driving was not the success that Marshall had hope, with the Tricentrol Championship costing more than anticipated and the only result of note was the start of the season, in the wet at the International Trophy at Silverstone, when he finished first in class and second overall. There were other flashes of brilliance but bad luck always seemed to prevail, like when leading at Donington when the gearlever broke off.

The start of the 1979 season looked promising, with Marshall forming GMR (Gerry Marshall Racing) in partnership with Roger Dowson to run two Triumph Dolomites in the Group 1 RAC Tricentrol Championship (with Rex Greenslade in the second car) and one car in both the Production Saloon car championships (which had both been one the season before). Both cars had continued sponsorship from Triplex and new deals with Esso, Motor and significant backing from BL Motorsport. Also, the engines were being prepared by Don Moore, who also built the engine for Marshall's Lister Jaguar for the Lloyds & Scottish series.

1979 was also the first season Marshall really started preparing cars for other people with GMR.
Things started well and even though being in a lower class he managed to battle for outright wins. There was also the accolade of John Webb and the BARC organising the Gerry Marshall Benefit Races at Brands Hatch and sharing the Dolomite with Roger Clark at the TT event at Silverstone and all seemed to be going well with Marshall really being at the height of his career when disaster struck at the Grand Prix support race in July 1979 which was supposed to be the highlight of the year, with good rides in the Dolomite and Lister Jaguar.

"As the Capris stormed off on their second lap, one of the nastiest accidents in recent saloon racing befell Gerry Marshall. Almost flat out down the straight from Stowe to Club, Marshall was fractionally ahead of Walkinshaw's Mazda and keen to stop him moving up to challenge class leader Greenslade. A few feet before the 100yds marker board, the two cars touched and Marshall was launched into a series of rolls, the severely damaged Sprint landing in the catch fencing at Club" Autosport, 19 July 1979.

Marshall would have been travelling over 100 mph and was extremely lucky to survive. During the accident, the sheer force made his helmet come off (still intact and fastened) and the mountings of his seat had broken, which meant he was thrown around the inside of the car, unprotected. He was knocked unconscious, had severe lacerations to his face and head (needing over 100 stitches), had three fractures to his skull, cracked ribs, damaged jaw, teeth, kidneys and damage to his back and spine (these plagued him through the rest of his life). As bad as this was, the doctors told him if his helmet had not come off he would probably have broken his neck.

He was out of hospital in ten days and back behind the wheel of a Dolomite and his Lister in the August Bank Holiday races at Brands Hatch and before the season was out he was back to winning ways, looking forward to the eighties and the possibility of more to come with his relationship with British Leyland.

For the 1980s Marshall decided to retire from full-time Group One racing as he wasn't happy with the current regulations and there was a disagreement with British Leyland. He therefore decided to concentrate on his racing team and Productions Saloons and also re-kindled his love affair for Historic racing.

He won various Production Saloon Championships (Wilcomatic, Monroe Shock Absorbers, etc.) and drove an even more diverse range of cars than ever before (also winning the Lloyds and Scottish Championship.

More racing (and winning) followed in the 1990s, notably in the TVR Tuscans (narrowly missing the title in 1991 due to political moves) and also the famous Marsh Plant Aston Martins. Gerry also found time to squeeze himself into the Multisport Van Dieman and Caterham Vauxhall for various one-off drives and a return to Production Saloons in Sierra and Sierra Sapphire Cosworths.

There were more historic outings in Jaguar E-Types, Austin-Healey 3000, Austin-Healey 100S, Chevrolet Corvettes, Ford Anglia, Lotus Cortinas, Ford Mustangs and who will forget his drive in the rain at the 1999 Goodwood Revival St Marys Trophy race, narrowly beating another saloon car legend John Rhodes. This drive also netted Marshall the coveted driver of the day award.

In 2000, on 6 August he scored his 600th win at Snetterton in the Marsh Plant Aston Martin DB4 and also made a return to racing a Vauxhall Firenza, driving one of the original 1974 Thruxton racecar Droop Snoots. There was also a reunion with Baby Bertha at the 2001 Goodwood Festival of Speed (as well as 2002/3 and several other demonstration runs).

Marshall continued to race with forays into Europe, as well as various British event. There were also outings at the Goodwood Revival in Mk1 Jaguars, Chevrolet Corvettes and Austin-Healey 100s, plus an Alvis Grey Lady and Ferrari 330LM that he shared with Ivan Dutton and Peter Hardman at the 2004 Revival, with his last race at Silverstone in November 2004.

Racing record

Complete British Saloon / Touring Car Championship results
(key) (Races in bold indicate pole position; races in italics indicate fastest lap.)

† Events with 2 races staged for the different classes.

‡ Endurance driver.

 Endurance driver – not eligible for points.

Complete Bathurst 1000 results

Complete Spa 24 Hours results

References

External links
 Gregor Marshall official site (archived)
 Pistonheads Heroes: Baby Bertha and Gerry Marshall

1941 births
2005 deaths
English racing drivers
British Touring Car Championship drivers